() is a political title from Central and Eastern Europe, historically assigned to military commanders.

Used by the Czechs in Bohemia since the 15th century. It was the title of the second-highest military commander in the Crown of the Kingdom of Poland and the Grand Duchy of Lithuania from the 16th to 18th centuries. Throughout much of the history of Romania and the Moldavia, hetmans were the second-highest army rank. In the modern Czech Republic the title is used for regional governors.

Etymology
The term hetman was a Polish borrowing, probably from the German  – captain or a borrowing of the comparable Turkic title ataman (literally 'father of horsemen').

Hetmans of Poland and Lithuania

The Polish title Grand Crown Hetman dates from 1505. The title of Hetman was given to the leader of the Polish Army. Until 1581 the hetman position existed only during specific campaigns and wars. After that, it became a permanent title, as were all the titles in the Crown of the Kingdom of Poland and the Polish–Lithuanian Commonwealth. At any given time the Commonwealth had four hetmans – a Great Hetman and Field (deputy) Hetman for each of both Poland and Lithuania. 

From 1585, the title could not be taken away without a proven charge of treachery, thus most hetmans served for life, as illustrated by the case of Jan Karol Chodkiewicz literally commanding the army from his deathbed (1621). Hetmans were not paid for their job by the royal treasury. Hetmans were the main commanders of the military forces, second only to the monarch in the army's chain of command. The fact that they could not be removed by the monarch made them very independent, and thus often able to pursue independent policies. 

This system worked well when a hetman had great ability and the monarch was weak, but sometimes produced disastrous results in the opposite case. The security of the position notably contrasted with that of military leaders in states bordering the commonwealth, where sovereigns could dismiss their army commanders at any time. In 1648 the Zaporizhian Host (the Polish–Lithuanian Commonwealth subject) elected a hetman of their own, Bohdan Khmelnytsky, igniting the Ukrainian struggle for independence.

The military reform of 1776 limited the powers of the hetmans. The Hetman office was abolished after the Third Partition of Poland (1795).

Hetmans of the Zaporozhian Host and Ukraine

At the end of the sixteenth century, the commanders of the Zaporizhian Cossacks were titled  or Hetman; Christof Kosynsky was the first Zaporizhian hetman. In 1572, a hetman was a commander of the Registered Cossack Army of the Rzeczpospolita, too. From 1648, the start of Bohdan Khmelnytsky's uprising, a hetman was the head of the whole Ukrainian State — . Although they were elected, Ukrainian hetmans had very broad powers and acted as heads of the Cossack state, they were supreme military commanders, and top legislators (by issuing administrative decrees).

After the split of Ukraine along the Dnieper River by the 1667 Polish–Russian Treaty of Andrusovo, Ukrainian Cossacks (and Cossack hetmans) became known as Left-bank Cossacks (of the Cossack Hetmanate) and Right-bank Cossacks.

In the Russian Empire, the office of Cossack Hetman was abolished by Catherine II of Russia in 1764. The last Hetman of the Zaporozhian Army (the formal title of the hetman of Ukraine) was Kyrylo Rozumovsky, who reigned from 1751 until 1764.

The title was revived in Ukraine during the revolution of 1917 to 1920. In early 1918, a conservative German-supported coup overthrew the radical socialist Ukrainian Central Rada and its Ukrainian People's Republic, establishing a hetmanate monarchy headed by Pavlo Skoropadskyi, who claimed the title Hetman of Ukraine. This regime lasted until late 1918, when it was overthrown by a new Directorate of Ukraine, of a re-established Ukrainian People's Republic.

Hetmans of Bohemia, Romania, and Moldavia
Used by the Czechs in Bohemia from the Hussite Wars (15th century) onward,  is today the term for the elected governor of a Czech region.

For much of the history of Romania and the Principality of Moldavia, hetmans were second in rank in the army, after the ruling prince, who held the position of voivode.

Other uses
Hetman has often been used figuratively to mean 'commander' or simply 'leader'.  Examples:
 "They say there was a whole band of them, and that this bearded man was their elder, the hetman." — Maxim Gorky, Mother (1906)
Queen (chess piece) is called hetman in Polish and coded as H in the algebraic notation.

See also
 Appointed Hetman
 Ataman
 Bulawa
 Hetman's sign

References

External links

 
Military ranks of Ukraine
Military organization of Cossacks
Military history of Ukraine
Ukrainian noble titles
Polish titles
Military ranks of Poland
Military ranks of Lithuania
Lithuanian titles
Slavic titles
Military ranks of Belarus
Titles of national or ethnic leadership